The 1999 Derby City Council election took place on 6 May 1999 to elect members of Derby City Council in England. One third of the council was up for election and the Labour party kept overall control of the council. Overall turnout was 29.0%.

After the election, the composition of the council was
Labour 34
Conservative 6
Liberal Democrat 4

Election result

Ward results

Abbey

Allestree

Alvaston

Babington

Blagreaves

Boulton

Breadsall

Darley

Littleover

Mackworth

Mickleover

Normanton

Osmanton

Sinfin

Spondon

References

1999 English local elections
1999
1990s in Derby